Lygumai   is a small town in Pakruojis District Municipality, Šiauliai County, northern-central Lithuania. As of 2011 it had a population of 601.

History
In 15th century the Lygumai estate of the Grand Duke of Lithuania was mentioned. 

Within the Polish-Lithuanian Commonwealth the place was also known under the Polonized name Ligumy.

In the beginning of August 1941, during the German occupation of Lithuania, the Jews of the village, about 70-80 men and over 100 women and children were assassinated. The mass execution was perpetrated by German Einsatzgruppen and local collaborators.

Elderate

Attractions
It is listed among the tallest buildings of Lithuania. Its exact height  was measured in 2016 and found to be 73.84 meters, including the 3-meter top cross.

References

Towns in Lithuania
Towns in Šiauliai County
Holocaust locations in Lithuania